The Stilklassen (German, lit. "style classes") are located in two schools in Berndorf, Lower Austria.

History
After a two-year construction phase, the schools were opened in 1909. What is special about these schools is their furnishing, which was funded by Arthur Krupp. The architect of these unique buildings is Ludwig Baumann. Each of the classrooms is furnished and designed in a different historical style.
Krupp's aim was to teach his workers' children the knowledge about foreign cultures that he was able to obtain on his journeys.

The Classrooms
 the Egyptian classroom: The entrance to this classroom is a replica of the burial chamber in Eimisi. The ceiling and the walls display typical Egyptian images.
 the Doric classroom: The bronze portal is a copy of the door of the tower of Mykena.
 the Moorish classroom: The door is a replica of the Porta aurea in Córdoba. The original pillars can be found at the Alhambra, whereas the motives on the ceiling are a faithful reproduction of the ceiling in the church Alkalda de Heinares.
 the Pompeian classroom
 the Byzantine classroom with motives from St. Sergius' church in Constantinople 
 the Gothic classroom, which displays motives of the churches in Steinakirchen am Forst, Lower Austria and Ptuj, Slovenia
 the Roman classroom by the example of the church of castle Třebíč, Czech Republic
 the Roman Renaissance classroom with a replica of the ceiling of the Palazzo Massimo in Rome
 the Baroque classroom with its reproduction of the entrance of Vienna's Belvedere palace
 the classroom built in the style of Louis XIV
 the Rococo classroom 
 the Empire classroom, built after motives in Palais Modena, Vienna

Interesting facts
Even in Krupp's time, when the schools were founded, parents were concerned that the pupils might be distracted by the colours and ornaments. 

Additionally to this extravagant interior design, Krupp also provided the school with a central heating system, showers and a dental surgery, which was paid for by Krupp himself for a year.

Nowadays, these two buildings do not only still serve as schools but also as tourist attractions.

Literature
 Ilg, Christine: Berndorf und seine Schulen - ein Streifzug durch Berndorf,

External links
 Stilklassen, German and English

Educational institutions established in 1909
Schools in Austria
1909 establishments in Austria